Malakeng is a community council located in the Mafeteng District of Lesotho. Its population in 2006 was 8,382.

Villages
The community of Malakeng includes the villages of Ha 'Majane, Ha 'Motsi, Ha Daniel, Ha Hlelesi, Ha Jase, Ha Kanono, Ha Kholoanyane, Ha Khorong, Ha Lemonomono, Ha Letooane, Ha Likhama, Ha Makhaooane, Ha Makhasane, Ha Makoanyane, Ha Maliehe, Ha Motau, Ha Ntele, Ha Phatela, Ha Pitso, Ha Qaba, Ha Rabele, Ha Ralehoabali, Ha Ralipoli, Ha Ramakhakhe, Ha Ramosoeu, Ha Rantanyane, Ha Rantho, Ha Rapokane, Ha Setlakotlako, Ha Shololo, Ha Tebelo, Ha Tlhone, Ha Tohlang, Ha Tšoeunyane, Ha Tsoinyane, Khilibiting, Lehlakaneng, Letlapeng (Malealea), Likhohloaneng, Lithabaneng, Litšoeneng, Makhetheng, Makhomalong (Malealea), Makhoseng, Malere, Metsohlong, Mohlakeng, Ngoana-Khare, Pitseng, Sekhutlong, Sekiring, Tšeea-Nku and Tutulung.

References

External links
 Google map of community villages

Populated places in Mafeteng District